Immortality is the ability to live forever, or eternal life throw God that has true immortality and from his love towards the humanity making earthing citizens immortal. Imortality conver myth to realistic whe God became a man name Jesus Christ preaching the truth of life giving quote "Who does the  will of god is immortal " known as son's and daughte's of god also population of his eternal kingdom of heaven .Now to the King eternal of Israel , immortal light, invisible spirit , the only God of living human , be all honor and all glory forever and ever. Amen.

Immortal or Immortality may also refer Soul Resurrection or Consious reborn.

Film
 The Immortals (1995 film), an American crime film
 Immortality, an alternate title for the 1998 British film The Wisdom of Crocodiles
 Immortality (2016 film), an Iranian experimental drama film
 Immortal (2004 film), a French science fiction film by Enki Bilal
 Immortals (2011 film), an American mythical action film
 Immortal (2015 film), an Iranian drama film
 Immortal (2022 film), a Finnish action film
 The Immortals (2015 film), an Indian documentary film
 The Immortal (2018 film), a Vietnamese fantasy film
 The Immortal (2019 film), an Italian crime film

Television
 Immortal (Highlander), sword-wielding characters from the Highlander film and television series
 "Immortality (Fringe)", a 2011 episode of Fringe
 The Immortal (1970 TV series), a 1970–1971 American television series
 The Immortal (2000 TV series), a 2000–2001 Canadian television series
 The Immortal (Buffyverse), a character in the Buffy the Vampire Slayer universe 
 Imortal, a 2010 Philippine TV series 
 "The Immortals" (NCIS), an episode of NCIS
 "Immortality" (CSI: Crime Scene Investigation), the series finale of CSI: Crime Scene Investigation
Immortality (TV series), an upcoming Chinese television series based on the BL xianxia novel The Husky and His White Cat Shizun
 Immortals (TV series), a 2018 Turkish web series

Military
 Immortals (Achaemenid Empire)
 Immortals (Sasanian Empire)
 Immortals (Byzantine Empire)
 Immortals, a nickname for the Napoleonic Old Guard
 Immortal 32, a nickname for the Siege of the Alamo relief force
 Akali Nihungs, Sikh warriors of whom the former part of the name literally means "immortals"

Music

Artists and labels
 Immortal (band), a Norwegian black metal musical group
 The Immortals (band), a Belgian techno group
 Immortal Records, a record label
 Immortal Technique (born 1978), Peruvian born American rapper and urban activist
 Roger Nichols (recording engineer) (1944–2011), American recording engineer, nicknamed "The Immortal"

Albums
 Immortal (Ann Wilson album), 2018
 Immortal (Anthem album), 2006
 Immortal (Beth Hart album), 1996
 Immortal (Bob Catley album), 2008
 Immortal (Cynthia Clawson album), 1986
 Immortal (D'espairsRay album), 2009
 Immortal (For Today album), a 2010 Christian metalcore album
 Immortal (Immortal EP), 1991 black metal album
 Immortal (Lorna Shore album), 2020 deathcore album
 Immortal (Michael Jackson album), 2011
 Immortal (Pyramaze album), 2008
 Immortal (Sarah Geronimo album) or Music and Me, a 2009 pop album
 Immortal (Tim Dog album), 2003
 Immortal? (Arena album), 2000
 Immortals (album), a 2017 album by Firewind

Songs
 Immortal (The Crüxshadows EP), 2008
"Immortal" (21 Savage song), 2019
 "Immortal" (J. Cole song), a 2016 song from 4 Your Eyez Only
 "Immortal" (Kid Cudi song), a 2013 single on the album Indicud
 "Immortal", a song by Adema from Insomniac's Dream
 "Immortal", a song by Clutch from Pure Rock Fury
 "Immortal", a song by Dream Evil from In the Night
 "Immortal", a song by Elley Duhé
 "Immortal", a song by Lil Gotit from the album Hood Baby 2
 "Immortal", a song by Lord from Fallen Idols
 "Immortal", a song by Marina and the Diamonds from the album Froot
 "Immortal", a song by Riot V from Unleash the Fire
 "Immortal", a song by Simi from the album Omo Charlie Champagne, Vol. 1
 "Immortal", a song by The Rasmus from Hide from the Sun
 "Immortal", a song written by Thomas Bergersen from Illusions
 "Immortals" (song), a 2014 song by Fall Out Boy
 "Immortals", a song by Hieroglyphics from The Kitchen
 "The Immortals" (song), a 2011 single by Kings of Leon from Come Around Sundown
 "I Feel Immortal", a 2010 song by Tarja recorded by Kerli under the title "Immortal"
 "Immortality" (Pearl Jam song), a 1995 single on the album Vitalogy
 "Immortality" (Celine Dion song), a 1998 single on the album Let's Talk About Love
 "Immortality", a 1975 single by Lesley Gore from the album Love Me by Name

Literature
 Immortals, the elected members of the Académie Française
 Immortal (Buffy novel), a 1999 Buffy the Vampire Slayer novelization by Christopher Golden and Nancy Holder
 Immortal (Image Comics), a comic book superhero character from the Image Comics series Invincible
 Immortal (trilogy), a series of three science fiction graphic novels
 Immortals (anthology), a 1998 anthology edited by Jack Dann and Gardner Dozois
 Immortality (novel), a 1990 novel by Milan Kundera
 "The Immortal" (short story), a 1949 short story by Jorge Luis Borges 
 The Immortals (Barjavel novel), a 1973 novel by René Barjavel
 The Immortals (Hickman novel), a 1996 novel by Tracy and Laura Hickman
 The Immortals (The Edge Chronicles), a novel in Paul Stewart and Chris Riddell's Edge Chronicles series
 The Immortals (series), a fantasy series by Tamora Pierce
 The Immortals (novel series), a fantasy series by Alyson Noel
 The Immortals, by James Gunn, the inspiration of the television series The Immortal
 Thirty-Six Immortals of Poetry, a group of medieval Japanese poets

Games
 Immortal (MUD), an administrator or developer on a MUD
 Immortal: The Invisible War, a table top, role-playing game by Ran Valerhon
 Immortal Game, a chess game played in 1851 by Adolf Anderssen against Lionel Kieseritzky
 The Immortal (video game), a 1990 isometric action-adventure game
 Immortality (video game), a 2022 narrative video game

Sports
 Immortal (professional wrestling), a heel pro wrestling stable
 Immortals (esports), esports organization founded in 2015
 Martín Dihigo (1906-1971), also called The Immortal, Cuban professional baseball player
 The Immortals (rugby league), the name given to the greatest rugby league players in Australia

Other uses
 Xian (Taoism), or Taoist immortal
 Eight Immortals, a group of legendary xian ("immortals") in Chinese mythology
 Immortal (comics), various characters and series
 Immortels, the members of the Académie Française
 Amrita, name of people, ceremonies, objects, etc. stemming from ancient India

See also
 Immortal Guards (disambiguation)
 Inmortal (disambiguation)
 Immortel (disambiguation)
 Immortelle (disambiguation)
 The Immortals (disambiguation)
 Temple of the Five Immortals (disambiguation)
 Eight Immortals (disambiguation)
 Immortality in fiction, a popular subject in fiction
 List of people who have claimed to be immortal